The Repedea (in its upper course also: Coșeana) is a right tributary of the river Latorița in Romania. It discharges into the Latorița near Ciungetu.

References

Rivers of Romania
Rivers of Vâlcea County